Glen Glenn Sound was an audio post production company formerly located in Hollywood, Los Angeles, California.

The company was co-founded by Glen R. Glenn and Harry Eckles (sound recordist) in 1937. It provided creative audio services to the television and film industry for five decades. The company was acquired by audio post production company Todd-AO in 1986. The facility was later purchased by Deluxe Entertainment Services Group in 2015, and the main theater is now "Stage One," the largest digital intermediate color theater in North America. It is located at 900 N Seward St, Hollywood, CA 90038.

Audio post productions
The Glen Glenn Sound company services have since been used on over 20,000 movies and television series episodes.

It was occasionally billed (credited) as Glen Glen, rather than as Glen Glenn, most particularly in Popkin productions.

Movies and TV shows
Movies and TV shows with sound recording and/or audio post production services done at Glen Glenn Sound include:

 Unashamed: A Romance (1938)
 The Ape Man (1943)
 Wild West (1946)
 Black Hills (1947)
 Border Feud (1947)
 Pioneer Justice (1947)
 Stage to Mesa City (1947)
 West to Glory (1947)
 Hands of a Stranger (1962)
 Manos: The Hands of Fate (1966)
 Check Your Guns  (1948)
 The Hawk of Powder River (1948)
 Tornado Range (1948)
 Dalton Gang  (1949)
 Prehistoric Women (1950)
 The Jack Benny Show (1950-1965)
 I Love Lucy (1951-1957)
 The Range Rider (1951-1953)
 The Adventures of Ozzie & Harriet (1952-1964)
 Make Room for Daddy (1953-1965)
 The Loretta Young Show (1953-1961) 
 Annie Oakley (1954-1957)
 Sergeant Preston of the Yukon  (1955-1958)
 The Adventures of Jim Bowie (1956-1958)
 Perry Mason (1957-1966)
 The Californians (1957-1959)
 The Lucy-Desi Comedy Hour (1957-1960)
 The Real McCoys (1957-1963)
 Whirlybirds (1957-1960)
 Sheriff of Cochise (1958-1960)
 The Untouchables (1959-1963)
 The Andy Griffith Show (1960-1968)
 The Dick Van Dyke Show (1961–1966, CBS)
 The Joey Bishop Show (1961-1965)
 The Lucy Show (1962–1968)
 My Favorite Martian  (1963-1966)
 Gomer Pyle, U.S.M.C. (1964-1969)
 Get Smart (1965-1970, CBS)
 That Girl (1966-1971)
 Mission Impossible (1966-1973, CBS)
 Star Trek (1966–1969, NBC)
 Star Trek II: The Wrath of Khan (1982)
 Mannix (1967-1975)
 Here's Lucy (1968–1974, CBS)
 Badlands (1973)
 The Brady Bunch (1969–1974, ABC)
 The New Perry Mason (1973-1974)
 Barney Miller  (1974-1982)
 Happy Days  (1974-1984)
 Little House on the Prairie (1974-1983)
 The Legend of Lizzie Borden (1975, ABC)
 Laverne and Shirley (1976-1983)
 Mork and Mindy (1978-1982)
 Taxi (1978-1983)
 Days of Heaven (1978)
 Heaven Can Wait (1978)
 Raise the Titanic (1980)
 Cagney & Lacey (1981-1986)
 Greatest American Hero (1981-1986)
 Cheers (1982–1986, NBC)
 The A-Team (1983-1986)
 Hardcastle and McCormick (1983-1986)
 Stop Making Sense (1984)
 Muppet Babies (1984-1986, CBS)
 Riptide (1984-1986)
 Perry Mason Returns (1985, NBC)
 Re-Animator (1985)
 Happy New Year, Charlie Brown! (1986)
 Jocks (1986)
 You're a Good Man, Charlie Brown (1986)
 Star Trek IV: The Voyage Home (1986)
 We're Back! A Dinosaur's Story'' (1993)

See also

References

Film sound production
Cinema of Southern California
Entertainment companies based in California
Film production companies of the United States
Television production companies of the United States
Defunct organizations based in Hollywood, Los Angeles
Mass media companies established in 1937
Mass media companies disestablished in 1986
1937 establishments in California
Defunct companies based in Greater Los Angeles
Defunct entertainment companies
Defunct mass media companies of the United States
1986 disestablishments in California
1986 mergers and acquisitions